In music, the mystic chord or Prometheus chord is a six-note synthetic chord and its associated scale, or pitch collection; which loosely serves as the harmonic and melodic basis for some of the later pieces by Russian composer Alexander Scriabin. Scriabin, however, did not use the chord directly but rather derived material from its transpositions.

When rooted in C, the mystic chord consists of the pitch classes: C, F, B, E, A, D.

This is often interpreted as a quartal hexachord consisting of an augmented fourth, diminished fourth, augmented fourth, and two perfect fourths. However, the chord may be spelled in a variety of ways, and it is related to other pitch collections, such as being a hexatonic subset of the overtone scale, lacking the perfect fifth.

Nomenclature
The term "mystic chord" appears to derive from Alexander Scriabin's intense interest in Theosophy, and the chord is imagined to reflect this mysticism. It was coined by Arthur Eaglefield Hull in 1916.

It is also known as the "Prometheus chord", after its extensive use in his work Prometheus: The Poem of Fire, Op. 60. The term was invented by Leonid Sabaneyev.

Scriabin himself called it the "chord of the pleroma" (аккорд плеромы akkord pleromy), which "was designed to afford instant apprehension of -that is, to reveal- what was in essence beyond the mind of man to conceptualize. Its preternatural stillness was a gnostic intimation of a hidden otherness."

Qualities
Jim Samson points out that it fits in well with Scriabin's mainly dominant quality sonorities and harmony, as it may take on a dominant quality on C or F. This tritone relationship between possible resolutions is important to Scriabin's harmonic language, and it is a property shared by the French sixth (also prominent in his work) of which the synthetic chord can be seen as an extension. The example below shows the mystic chord rewritten as a French sixth with notes A and D as extensions:

The pitch collection is related to the octatonic scale, the whole tone scale, and the French sixth, all of which are capable of a different number of transpositions. For example, the chord is a whole tone scale with one note raised a semitone (the "almost whole-tone" hexachord, sometimes identified as "whole tone-plus"), and this alteration allows for a greater variety of resources through transposition.

Leonid Sabaneev interpreted the Prometheus chord as harmonics 8 through 14, without 12 (1, 9, 5, 11, 13, 7 = C, D, E, F, A, B), but the 11th harmonic is 48.68 cents away from the tritone (F), the 13th harmonic is 59.47 cents away from a major sixth (A).

However, to quote Carl Dahlhaus, "the interval-distance of the natural-tone-row [overtones] [...], counting up to 20, includes everything from the octave to the quarter tone, (and) useful and useless musical tones. The natural-tone-row [harmonic series] justifies everything, that means, nothing." Elliott Antokoletz says the "so-called 'mystic chord'" approximates harmonics 7 through 13 (7, 8, 9, 10, (11,) 12, 13 = C, D, E, F, (G,) A, B). 

The notes of the chord also conform to a Lydian dominant quality, the fourth mode of the melodic minor scale.

Use by Scriabin
Some sources suggest that much of Scriabin's music is entirely based on the chord to the extent that whole passages are little more than long sequences of this chord, unaltered, at different pitches; but this is rarely the case. More often than not, the notes are reordered so as to supply a variety of harmonic or melodic material. Certain of Scriabin's late pieces are based on other synthetic chords or scales that do not rely on the mystic chord.

Other sources suggest that Scriabin's method of pitch organization is based on ordered scales that feature scale degrees. Since the mystic chord is a synthetic chord, the scale from which it derives, sometimes called the "Prometheus scale", is an example of a synthetic scale.

For example, a group of piano miniatures (Op. 58, Op. 59/2, Op. 61, Op. 63, Op. 67/1 and Op. 69/1) are governed by the acoustic and/or the octatonic scales.

Contrary to many textbook descriptions of the chord, which present the sonority as a series of superposed fourths, Scriabin most often manipulated the voicings to produce a variety of melodic and harmonic intervals.  A rare example of purely quartal spacing can be found in the Fifth Piano Sonata (mm. 264 and 268). Measures 263–264 are shown below.

Incomplete versions of the chord spaced entirely in fourths are considerably more common, for example, in Deux Morceaux, Op. 57.

According to George Perle, Scriabin used this chord in what he calls a pre-serial manner, producing harmonies, chords, and melodies. However, unlike the twelve tone technique to which Perle refers, Scriabin, like Perle, did not use his Mystic chord as an ordered set and did not worry about repeating or omitting notes or aggregate combinatoriality.

Use by other composers
With the increasing use of more dissonant sonorities, some composers of the 20th and 21st centuries have used this chord in various ways.

See also
Elektra chord
Petrushka chord
Psalms chord
Thirteenth
Tristan chord

Notes

References

Further reading
Hewitt, Michael. Musical Scales of the World. The Note Tree. 2013. .

External links 
 Some occurrences of the Mystic chord in the scores of the Petrucci Music Library

Post-tonal music theory
Chords
Hexachords
Hemitonic scales